Armit River is a river in the Canadian provinces of Manitoba and Saskatchewan in the Nelson River drainage basin. The river begins in the Porcupine Hills of the Manitoba Escarpment at Armit Lake and flows in a northerly direction closely following the Manitoba / Saskatchewan border and into Red Deer Lake along the course of the Red Deer River.

Course 
Armit River begins from the north-western shore of Armit Lake, which is the largest lake in the Porcupine Hills, and flows northward through boreal forest, canyons, muskeg, and rolling hills en route to Red Deer Lake. Once the river leaves Armit Lake, it flows into the smaller Little Armit Lake and from there, it crosses into Saskatchewan following a valley. Shortly after, the river re-enters Manitoba and flows through muskeg and into Muskeg Lake. North from Muskeg Lake, the river flows through the 264-hectare Armit Meadows Ecological Reserve and then into Armit River Canyon, which takes it out of the Porcupine Hills and back into Saskatchewan. The river then parallels the border past Highway 3 before returning to Manitoba where it is met by Little Armit River. Armit River carries on to the north-east and into a large marshy estuary at Red Deer Lake. Several other rivers flow into this same estuary, such as Red Deer River, Little Woody River, and Lost River. Most of the river's course is in Manitoba's Porcupine Provincial Forest and Saskatchewan's Porcupine Provincial Forest.

Tributaries 
Several rivers flow into Armit River, including the following:
Johnson Creek
Little Armit River
North Armit River
Kinakin Creek
Geize Creek
Duncan Creek

Armit River Recreation Site 
Armit River Recreation Site is a Saskatchewan provincial recreation site on the banks of the Armit River in the RM of Hudson Bay No. 394. It is right on the border with Manitoba and accessed from Saskatchewan's Highway 3. It has a small campground, hiking trails, and access to the river for fishing. Brook trout are a commonly found fish in the river.

See also 
List of rivers of Manitoba
List of rivers of Saskatchewan
List of protected areas of Manitoba
List of protected areas of Saskatchewan
List of ecological reserves in Manitoba

References

External links 
The path to Armit River Canyon

Rivers of Northern Manitoba
Rivers of Saskatchewan
Tributaries of Hudson Bay
Hudson Bay No. 394, Saskatchewan